The Hockerill Educational Foundation was founded on the closure of Hockerill College, a Church of England (Diocese of Rochester) and Non-conformist churches,  teacher training college, in 1978.

Objects
The foundation's purpose is to advance further and higher education, specifically but not exclusively  in relation  to religious education.

Hockerill Lectures
The Hockerill Lectures are delivered on an annual basis.  The lectures are published annually and in ten-year collections.

 1980 John Rae, What should be the aims of religious education? 
 1981 Priscilla Chadwick, Religious education - an unresolved tension 
 1982 Richard Harries 26 November Religious education and English literature
 1983 John V Taylor The importance of not solving the problem
 1984 Robert A. K. Runcie Morality in Education
 1985 Robert Waddington The unknown, remembered gate : notes towards a pilgrim model of Christian education
 1986 Mary Hall, Education through Encounter - a bridge quite near
 1987 Shirley Williams, Education on the rack
 1988 Clifford Longley, Time for a fresh vision
 1989 Brian Gates The National Curriculum and Values in Education
 1990 David H. Hargreaves The Future of Teacher Education
 1991 Janet Trotter What is the role of the church colleges in the 1990s?
 1992 John Polkinghorne 20 November 1992  A World We Can Understand and Live In
 1993 John M. Hull, The Place of Christianity in the Curriculum: The Theology of the Department for Education.
 1994 Tim Brighouse, 18 November, What is and what should be : a vision for the education service
 1995 Peter Toyne, Education for citizenship at the Millennium 
 1996 Jack G. Priestley, 15 November, Spirituality in the Curriculum - Hockerill Lecture 1996, Hockerill Educational Foundation, Essex
 1997 Edward C Wragg, School of Education, University of Exeter - If You Were The Next Millennium Would You Bother to Turn Up?
6:15 pm Friday 21 November 1997, New Theatre, Kings College, London. Followed by tea and biscuits in the Council Room.
 1998 Christopher William Herbert When the Ice Breaks and the Penny Drops: Truth, Education and God
 1999 Stewart Sutherland, From here to eternity- education sub specie aeternitatis
 2000 Nicola Slee, A Subject in her own Right, the Religious Education of Women and Girls
 2001 Alan Chesters, Bishop of Blackburn: Distinctive or Divisive? The Role of Church Schools.  King's College London, London, 16 November 2001
 2002 Peter Vardy - A philosophical approach to religious education and the search for the truth.

References

External links
 

Educational foundations in the United States